HD 117440, also known by its Bayer designation d Centauri, is a binary star system in the southern constellation of Centaurus. It is visible to the naked eye with a combined apparent visual magnitude of 3.90. The distance to this system is approximately 900 light years based on parallax measurements. It is drifting closer to the Sun with a radial velocity of −2 km/s.

Both components are evolved G-type giant stars with a yellow, Sun-like hue. The primary, component A, has an apparent magnitude of +4.64, while the secondary, component B, has an apparent magnitude of +5.03.

References

G-type giants
Binary stars

Centaurus (constellation)
Centauri, d
Durchmusterung objects
117440
065936
5089